Nicolae Teodorescu (1797–1880) was a Moldavian, later Romanian church painter (muralist), and the uncle of artist Gheorghe Tattarescu.

In 1831, he was called on by Chesarie Căpățână, the Orthodox bishop of Buzău to open a school for church painters at the local bishopric. He also brought his nephew to study there.

In his over 50 years career, Teodorescu painted several churches in and around Buzău, such as the churches at the Ciolanu and Răteşti monasteries and the Banului church in Buzău.

1797 births
1880 deaths
Romanian muralists